Mowbrays Educational Society is a chain of schools in Chennai, Tamil Nadu, India with three branches in Alwarpet, Velachery and Nanganallur. Founded in 1976 by T.K.Kumaraswamy, the schools have been recognised by the state government of Tamil Nadu. Mowbrays educates students in all grades from pre-kindergarten to XII. The higher secondary school is known as the Mowbrays Matriculation Higher Secondary School. The secondary school is known for its intensity and pressure it puts on students.

References

External links
 Official site

High schools and secondary schools in Chennai
Educational institutions established in 1976
Educational organisations based in India
1976 establishments in Tamil Nadu